Stephen Kewasis  is an Anglican bishop in Kenya. he was Bishop of Eldoret from 1990 to 1997; and  Bishop of Kitale from then until  2018.

Notes

21st-century Anglican bishops of the Anglican Church of Kenya
20th-century Anglican bishops of the Anglican Church of Kenya
Anglican bishops of Eldoret
Anglican bishops of Kitale